Penanjong Beach is a beach in Kampong Penanjong, Pekan Tutong, Tutong, Brunei. The beach is known for water sport activities and view of sunsets over the South China Sea. It should also be noted that parts of the beach which stretches from Penanjong are located within a military base.

An average of 8.7% heavy minerals such as quartz were found on the beach. On January 24, 2020, Royal Brunei Land Forces (RBLF) servicemen from the nearby Penanjong Garrison carried out a cleaning campaign on the beach.

References 

Tutong District
Beaches of Brunei